Yana Kedrina (born 4 October 1990), better known by her stage name Kedr Livanskiy, is a Russian electronic musician, singer-songwriter, record producer and DJ.

Life and career
Kedrina was born on 4 October 1990 in Moscow, Russian SFSR. She started her music career as a singer in the short-lived punk rock band Hesburger, after briefly playing drums in a sludge group. During this time, she majored in literature at college, before enrolling to Moscow School of New Cinema.

In the early 2010s, Kedrina and her friends started the underground musical collective Johns' Kingdom, which spawned her interest in electronic music. After debuting her tracks under the name Kedr Livanskiy on SoundCloud, she signed to New Jersey-based record label 2MR, which was co-founded by Mike Simonetti of Troubleman Unlimited and Mike Sniper of Captured Tracks. In late 2015, Kedrina released her debut single, "Sgoraet", which was followed by her 2016 EP, January Sun. 2MR issued her debut full-length album, Ariadna in September 2017; her second studio album, dub- and deep house-influenced Your Need, was released in 2019. In August 2021, she announced a new album, titled Liminal Soul, released on October 1, 2021.

Musical style and influences
AllMusic's Paul Simpson characterized Kedr Livanskiy's music as lo-fi electronic pop and indie electronic that draws on '90s techno and jungle influences, while labeling her early songs as "wintry lo-fi house and jungle tracks with supremely haunting vocal melodies." Aimee Cliff of The Guardian described her style as "shoegaze-y electronic music that sounds as if it has arrived in a time capsule from a retro-futurist era." Her debut EP, January Sun, featured elements from "'90s-era UK electronic music, dreamy alt-rock and radio pop." Her subsequent releases eschewed software synthesizers in favor of analog gear, including Roland SH-101 and Roland Juno-106; 2017's Ariadna was compared to the works of techno producers Patricia and Huerco S. Her second album, Your Need, employed Roland TR-808 as a backbone and featured production input from Russian producer Flaty. Kedr Livanskiy's lyrics are sung in Russian and English.

Kedrina has cited Autechre, Aphex Twin, Boards of Canada and Mazzy Star as influences. She also noted MTV and 90s musical aesthetic as influences on her early releases, while her second album Your Need was driven by her love of "DJing classic house, breakbeat, and garage," as well as bassline, speed garage and grime.

Discography

Studio albums
January Sun (2016; 2MR)
Ariadna (2017; 2MR)
 Your Need (2019; 2MR)
 Liminal Soul (2021; 2MR)

EPs
Sgoraet (2015; 2MR)
ОСЕНЬ-AUTUMN (2018; 2MR)

Singles  
 "No More Summer Rain" (2014; 2MR)
 "There Was a Time (было время)" (2018; 2MR)

Music videos
 "solnce yanvarya" (2014)
 "соловьиные песни" (2014)
 "No More Summer Rain" (2015)
 "razrushitelniy krug" (2015)
 "Otvechai za slova (Keep Your Word)" (2016)
 "Ariadna" (2017)
 "Your Name" (2017)
 "There Was a Time (было время)" (2018)
 "Kiska" (2019)
 "Sky Kisses" (2019)
 "Ivan Kupala (New Day) (Иван купала)" (2020)

Notes

References

External links

Living people
1990 births
Synth-pop musicians
Russian women singer-songwriters
Russian record producers
Russian DJs
Russian women musicians
Women DJs
Electropop musicians
21st-century women musicians
21st-century Russian women singers
21st-century Russian singers
Synth-pop singers
Russian pop musicians
Lo-fi musicians
Women in electronic music
Singers from Moscow
Electronic dance music DJs